Cambay, Kambay or Khambhat was a princely state in India during the British Raj. The City of Khambat (Cambay) in present-day Gujarat was its capital. The state was bounded in the north by the Kaira district and in the south by the Gulf of Cambay.

Cambay was the only state in the Kaira Agency of the Gujarat division of the Bombay Presidency, which merged into the Baroda and Gujarat States Agency in 1937.

History
Cambay was founded as a state in 1730 by the penultimate Mughal governor of Gujarat, Mirza Ja‘far Mu’min Khan I, the last of the Mughal governors of Gujarat, at the time of the dismemberment of Mughal rule in India. In 1742 Mirza Ja‘far Mu’min Khan I defeated his brother-in-law Nizam Khan, governor of Khambhat, and established himself in his place.

In 1780 Cambay was taken by the British Army, led by General Goddard Richards, but it was restored to the Marathas in 1783. Finally it was ceded to the British by the Peshwa after the Treaty of Bassein in 1803. Cambay became a British protectorate in 1817. The state was provided with a railway in 1901. Cambay's last ruler signed the accession to the Indian Union on 10June 1948.

Hub of mercantile activity 
The traders and the merchants reached here from across the world. Cambay was known for its cotton and silk cloths. Cambay was one of India's most active trade center since the 14th century (Source: Ibn Battuta). After 200 years, Duarte Barbosa described Cambay as an important commercial center with carpets, and other textile goods in Mughal established industries.

Rulers

The rulers of the state bore the title of 'Nawab' and had the privilege of an 11-gun salute.

Nawabs
1730 – 1742 Mirza Jaffar Mumin Khan I, penultimate Mughal governor of Gujarat
1742 – 1743 Nur-ud-din Muftakher Khan 
1743 – 1784                Najm ad-Dawla Ja`far Mu´min Khan II 
1784 – 1790                Mohammad Qoli Khan                 (d. 1790) 
1790 – 28 October 1823         Fath `Ali Khan                     (d. 1823) 
1823 – 15 March 1841         Banda `Ali Khan                    (d. 1841) 
1841 – Apr 1880            Husayn Yawar Khan I                (d. 1880) 
11 Jun 1880 – 21 January 1915  Najib ad-Dawla Mumtaz al-Molk Ja`far `Ali Khan    (b. 1848 – d. 1915)   
21 Jan 1915 – 1930         .... -Regent                 
21 Jan 1915 – 15 Aug 1947/10 June 1948  Nizam ad-Dawla Najm ad-Dawla Mumtaz al-Molk Husayn Yawar Khan II     (b. 1911 – d. ....)

List of Nawabs of Cambay state 
Mirza JA'AFAR MU'MIN KHAN I 1730/1742, last Muslim Governor of Gujarat
Nawab NURADDIN MUFTAKHAR KHAN 1742/1743
Nawab JA'AFAR MU'MIN KHAN II 1743/1784
Nawab MUHAMMED QULI KHAN 1784/1790, son of Najam Khan (poisoned 1748), married and had issue. He died 1790.
Nawab FATH ALI KHAN (qv)
Nawab FATH ALI KHAN 1790/1823, eldest of three sons, he received the title Najum-ud-Daulah Mumtaz-ul-Mulk Khan Bahadur Dilawar Jung, and the rank of a commander of six thousand as Nawab of Cambay.
Najum-ud-Daulah Mumtaz-ul-Mulk Momin Khan Bahadur Dilawar Jung Nawab BANDA ALI KHAN 1823/1841
Najum-ud-Daulah Mumtaz-ul-Mulk Momin Khan Bahadur Dilawar Jung Nawab HUSAIN YAWAR KHAN I 1841/1880
Najum-ud-Daulah Mumtaz-ul-Mulk Momin Khan Bahadur Dilawar Jung Nawab JA'AFAR ALI KHAN Bahadur 1880/1915, born 1848, succeeded 11 June 1880 (#1), married 1stly, 1876, Bibi Gauhar Khanum Saheb, married 2ndly, 1882, Bibi Khurshid Jahan Begum. He died 21 January 1915.
HH Najum-ud-Daulah Mumtaz-ul-Mulk Momin Khan Bahadur Dilawar Jung Nawab Mirza HUSAIN YAWAR KHAN II Bahadur 1915/- , born 16 May 1911, educated at Rajkumar College, Rajkot; married January 1936, Nawabzadi Safia Sultan Qizilbash, daughter of Nawab Sir Fateh Ali Khan Qizilbash of Lahore (see Nawabganj), and had issue.
HH Najum-ud-Daulah Mumtaz-ul-Mulk Momin Khan Bahadur Dilawar Jung Nawab Mirza MUHAMMED JA'AFAR ALI KHAN

See also
Political integration of India
Princely State
Baroda and Gujarat States Agency

References

 https://web.archive.org/web/20091009120131/http://www.uq.net.au/~zzhsoszy/ips/c/cambay.html

External links

Princely states of India
Anand district
Gulf of Khambhat
Bombay Presidency
1730 establishments in India
1948 disestablishments in India